Harold Wilson was a New Zealand cricketer. He played seven first-class matches for Auckland between 1923 and 1927.

See also
 List of Auckland representative cricketers

References

External links
 

Year of birth missing
Year of death missing
New Zealand cricketers
Auckland cricketers
Place of birth missing